Princess Alexia of Greece and Denmark (born 10 July 1965) is a Greek former princess and educator. She is the eldest child of Constantine II and Anne-Marie of Denmark, who were King and Queen of Greece from 1964 until the abolition of the monarchy in 1973. She was heiress presumptive to the Greek throne from her birth in 1965 until the birth of her brother Crown Prince Pavlos in 1967.

Early life

Alexia was born on 10 July 1965 at Mon Repos, a villa on the Greek island of Corfu used at the time as a summer residence by the Greek royal family. She was the first child born to the then King Constantine II and Queen Anne-Marie of the Hellenes. At the time of her birth, her father was King of Greece, her grandfather was King of Denmark, and her great-grandfather was King of Sweden. 

As the monarch's only child, between her own birth and the birth on 20 May 1967 of her brother Pavlos, Alexia was heir presumptive to the throne of the Hellenes, then an extant monarchy. 
The Greek Constitution of 1952 had changed 
Greece's order of succession to the throne  from the previous Salic law, prevalent in much of the continent, and which precluded the succession of women, to male-preference primogeniture, which accorded succession to the throne to a female member of a dynasty if she has no brothers, similar to the then extant succession laws of the United Kingdom, Denmark and Spain.

Alexia grew up in exile and was raised in between Rome and London. Prior to her education at the Hellenic College of London, she attended the Miss Surtee’s School for Boys and Girls in Rome, Italy. After Hellenic College, she went to the Froebel College of the Roehampton Institute, a division of the University of Surrey, in 1985 and took a BA in History and Education in 1988.
In 1989, she achieved a Post Graduate Certificate of Education and became a primary school teacher in the inner city area of Southwark in London between 1989 and 1992 before moving to Barcelona where she became a teacher of children with developmental disabilities.

Marriage and children

On 9 July 1999, Alexia married Carlos Javier Morales Quintana, an architect and a champion yachtsman, at St. Sophia Cathedral, London. The bride wore a gown by the Austrian designer Inge Sprawson. Her attendants were her sister Princess Theodora, her niece Princess Maria-Olympia, and Princess Mafalda, daughter of Kyril, Prince of Preslav, a son of former King Simeon of Bulgaria. The couple have four children: 
Arrietta Morales y de Grecia (b. 24 February 2002, Barcelona)
Anna-Maria Morales y de Grecia (b. 15 May 2003, Barcelona)
Carlos Morales y de Grecia (b. 30 July 2005, Barcelona)
Amelia Morales y de Grecia (b. 26 October 2007, Barcelona) 

Alexia and her family now live in her husband's native land, at Puerto Calero marina, Yaiza, Lanzarote in the Canary Islands, in a house designed by her husband.

Titles and styles 

 10 July 1965 – present: Her Royal Highness Princess Alexia of Greece and Denmark

Honours

  Greek Royal Family: Knight Grand Cross of the Order of the Redeemer
  Greek Royal Family: Dame Grand Cross, Special Class of the Order of Saints Olga and Sophia (by birth)

Ancestry

Citations

References
 

1965 births
Living people
20th-century Greek people
21st-century Greek people
20th-century Greek women
21st-century Greek women
Nobility from Corfu
Greek princesses
Danish princesses
House of Glücksburg (Greece)
Alumni of the University of Roehampton
Members of the Church of Greece
Special educators
Spanish schoolteachers
Daughters of kings
People from Lanzarote
Greek expatriates in Spain
Children of Constantine II of Greece